Virrey del Pino is a city in La Matanza Partido, in the Buenos Aires Province of Argentina.

With a total of 117 km², it is the most extensive city in the La Matanza Partido. It is crossed by the RN 3 between kilometers 34 and 48. In this town, there is a Mercedes-Benz plant, in which the Sprinter and Vito utilities are produced, the chassis OF 1621, OH 1621 & 1721 and the Atron 1720 truck. Also in this town, there is the main plant of soft drinks Manaos (drink) and the radio station of Radio Continental.

History 
The city's name means "Viceroy del Pino" and refers to Joaquín del Pino, who was viceroy of the Río de la Plata from 1801 to 1804. There are no historical documents explaining why the city received this name. Historians suggest that since one of the many sons and daughters of the viceroy visited one of the local ranches, the locals decided that it belonged to the viceroy himself, and then the name spread to the whole area.

Barrios

References

La Matanza Partido
Populated places in Buenos Aires Province